Duluth is a 1983 novel by Gore Vidal. He considered it one of his best works, as did Italo Calvino, who wrote, "Vidal's development...along that line from Myra Breckinridge to Duluth, is crowned with great success, not only for the density of comic effects, each one filled with meaning, not only for the craftsmanship in construction, put together like a clock-work which fears no word processor, but because this latest book holds its own built-in theory, that which the author calls 'après post-structuralism'. I consider Vidal to be a master of that new form which is taking shape in world literature and which we may call the hyper-novel or the novel elevated to the square or the cube."

Plot summary
One of the experimental texts Vidal refers to as his "inventions", Duluth describes both a novel written about Duluth (that, bordered on one side by Minneapolis and on the other by Michigan, bears scant resemblance to the real city) and a television series
of the same name; when residents of the city die, they end up as characters in the TV show, who can in some cases continue interacting with the living through the TV screen. When members of the cast of Duluth, the TV show, die, they become characters in Rogue Duke, a romance novel serialized in the pages of Redbook, the popular women's magazine.

The author of all three, Rosemary Klein Kantor, is herself a character in the book, making cameo appearances throughout. She generates texts with the aid of a computer, adding to its numerous geographical and historical errors her mangled clichés ("Bellamy Craig II plays hardball...in the fast lane!") and unusual grammatical constructions ("Her handcuffs now handcuffed her hands"). However, there is in the city of Duluth a mysterious cerise flying saucer whose insectoid alien inhabitants, after meddling in the spectacularly corrupt politics of the city, use an accidental tense shift to seize control of the computer, erasing the human race from the face of the earth and bringing the book to an end.

References

External links
Christopher Lehmann-Haupt review
Time review

Duluth
1983 American novels
Duluth, Minnesota
Novels set in Minnesota
Random House books